The city-state of Singapore has over 9,000 completed high-rises, the majority located in the Downtown Core, the city centre of Singapore.  In the city, there are 96 skyscrapers. The Guoco Tower currently holds the title of tallest building in Singapore. It stands at 283.7m (931 ft), exempted from the height restriction of 280m in the Central Business District. A supertall tower will be built at the current AXA Tower site in future, standing at 305m.

Singapore's history of skyscrapers began with the 1939 completion of the 17-storey Cathay Building. The  structure was, at the time of its completion, the tallest building in Southeast Asia; it was superseded by the  Asia Insurance Building in 1954, which remained the tallest in Singapore for more than a decade. Singapore went through a major building boom in the 1970s and 1980s that resulted from the city's rapid industrialisation. During this time OUB Centre (present-day One Raffles Place) became the tallest building in the city-state; the  structure was also the tallest building in the world outside of North America from its 1986 completion until 1989, when the Bank of China Tower in Hong Kong was completed.

Since 2000, there has been a sharp increase in the number of skyscrapers under construction in the city area, particularly in the Marina Bay district. One project completed in Marina Centre is the Marina Bay Financial Centre, which includes 3 office towers offering  of office space, 2 residential developments offering 649 apartments and a  retail mall, named Marina Bay Link Mall. There are also several new developments in the city's shopping hub, Orchard Road. In addition, the  Ocean Financial Centre, a 43-floor skyscraper, is built in Raffles Place.

With Jurong Lake District envisioned as Singapore's second central business district, more skyscrapers are shaping the skyline there. However, its close proximity to Tengah Air Base meant that height restrictions apply there as well. The JTC Summit, a  office tower built in 2000, stands as the tallest building outside the Central Region.



Tallest buildings
This includes spires and architectural details but does not include antenna masts. An equal sign (=) following a rank indicates the same height between two or more buildings. The "Year" column indicates the year in which a building was completed.

Tallest under construction
This lists buildings that are under construction in Singapore. A floor count of 40 stories is used as the cutoff for buildings whose heights have not yet been released by their developers.

* Table entries without text indicate that information regarding building heights has not yet been released.

Timeline of tallest buildings
This lists commercial buildings that once held the title of tallest building in Singapore. As of 2016, the title of tallest building in Singapore is held by Guoco Tower.

Notes

A. ^ The UIC Building, completed in 1973, tied the height of Meritus Mandarin Singapore Tower Two. The city therefore had two tallest buildings until the completion of the United Overseas Bank Plaza Two in 1974.
B. ^ The United Overseas Bank Plaza One, completed in 1992, tied the height of the Overseas Union Bank Centre. The city therefore had two tallest buildings until the completion of Republic Plaza in 1995, which also tied the height of the two older structures. From 1995 to 2016, Singapore had three tallest buildings until Guoco Tower was completed.
C. ^ The building has since been demolished.

See also
 Future developments in Singapore
 List of tallest structures by country

References
General
 
 
Specific

External links
 Diagram of Singapore skyscrapers on SkyscraperPage.com

Singapore
Tall buildings
 
Singapore